Kristina Krepela (born 4 September 1979) is a Croatian actress, the best known for playing in movies La Femme Musketeer and The Hunting Party and in telenovela Ne daj se, Nina, the Croatian version of Ugly Betty.

Career
Krepela trained on the Academy of Dramatic Arts in Zagreb.

Her first role was in the short-movie Leptir (Butterfly), in 2003. Her next role was not so small. She played the Spanish Infanta Maria Theresa in Hallmark Channel television movie La Femme Musketeer, along with Gérard Depardieu, Michael York, Nastassja Kinski, John Rhys-Davies and Susie Amy.

She returned to Zagreb, taking role of Ivana in Croatian telenovela Ljubav u zaledju (Love in the Offside). In 2007, she had a little appearance in the movie The Hunting Party, along with Richard Gere.

Since October 2007, Krepela has played Barbara in Ne daj se, Nina (Don't Give Up, Nina), Croatian version of Ugly Betty and unknown woman in Game of Thrones .

Filmography

References

External links 
 

Croatian actresses
1979 births
Living people
Actresses from Zagreb